Devil's Cargo is a 1948 American film directed by John F. Link Sr.

It was the fourteenth of the sixteen Falcon films produced in the 1940s, and the first of the three featuring the magician and actor John Calvert. The film was released by Film Classics, instead of RKO Pictures.

Plot summary

Cast
 John Calvert as Michael "The Falcon" Watling
 Rochelle Hudson as Margo Delgado
 Roscoe Karns as Lt. Hardy
 Lyle Talbot as Johnny Morello
 Theodore von Eltz as Thomas Mallon
 Michael Mark as Salvation Army Captain
 Tom Kennedy as Naga, Mug Who Tails Delgado
 Paul Marion as Ramon Delgado
 Paul Regan as Bernie Horton
 Eula Guy as Mrs. Murphy, landlady
 Walter Soderling as The Coroner
 Peter Michael as Mr. Worthington
 Fred Coby as Fred

References

External links
 
 
 
 
 

1948 films
American mystery films
1948 crime films
American black-and-white films
Films scored by Paul Dessau
Film Classics films
1948 mystery films
American crime films
The Falcon (film character) films
1940s English-language films
1940s American films